From NFB to Box-Office is a 2009 documentary by Quebec film director and producer Denys Desjardins. The film documents the development of Quebec cinema, from the founding of the National Film Board of Canada in 1939 to the creation of the Canadian Film Development Corporation in 1968, recounting the stories of Quebec filmmakers who never gave up on their dream to produce feature-length fiction films, and creating a Quebec film industry.

Filmmakers featured
 Denys Arcand
 Paule Baillargeon
 Roger Blais
 Michel Brault
 Marcel Carrière
 Fernand Dansereau
 André Forcier
 Claude Fournier
 Jacques Godbout
 Guy Godin
 Denis Héroux
 Pierre Juneau
 Jean Pierre Lefebvre
 André Lamy
 André Link
 Jean-Claude Labrecque
 Jean-Claude Lord
 Pierre Patry
 Anne Claire Poirier
 Roger Racine
 Jean Roy
 Stéphane Venne
 René Verzier

See also
The Private Life of Cinema

References
 information about this film
 an article about the film

2009 films
Canadian documentary films
Documentary films about the cinema of Canada
Films directed by Denys Desjardins
National Film Board of Canada documentaries
2009 documentary films
Film box office
French-language Canadian films
2000s Canadian films